is located in the Hidaka Mountains, Hokkaidō, Japan.
The mountain has three peaks:
  — 
  — 
  —

References
 Google Maps
 Geographical Survey Institute
 Shyun Umezawa, Yasuhiko Sugawara, and Jun Nakagawa, Hokkaidō Natsuyama Gaido 4: Hidaka Sanmyaku no Yamayama (北海道夏山ガイド4日高山脈の山やま), Sapporo, Hokkaidō Shimbunshya, 1991. 

Yoko